Chris Nelson may refer to:

Chris Nelson (politician), Secretary of State of South Dakota
Chris Nelson (baseball) (born 1985), third baseman
Chris Nelson (photographer) (1960–2006), co-founder of Bear magazine
Chris Nelson (wrestler) (born 1974), American wrestler

See also
Christopher Nelson (disambiguation)